Brandýs nad Labem-Stará Boleslav is an administratively united pair of towns in Prague-East District in the Central Bohemian Region of the Czech Republic. It has about 19,000 inhabitants and it is the second largest Czech united pair of towns after Frýdek-Místek. Historic centres of both Brandýs nad Labem and Stará Boleslav are well preserved and are protected by law as urban monument zones.

Administrative parts
The municipality is made up of towns of Brandýs nad Labem and Stará Boleslav and a village of Popovice.

Geography
Brandýs nad Labem-Stará Boleslav lies about 25 km northeast from Prague. It is part of the Prague metropolitan area. It is located in the Central Elbe Table plateau, in the heart of the agricultural region of Polabí.

Brandýs nad Labem-Stará Boleslav lies upon the Elbe river, Brandýs nad Labem on the left bank and Stará Boleslav on the right bank. The Proboštovský Pond lies in the municipal territory.

History
Brandýs nad Labem dates its origin to the 13th century. The town was originally named Boleslav by Boleslaus I who built here his castle at the beginning of the 10th century.

Stará Boleslav is a historical town and the oldest pilgrimage site in Central Bohemia. It was an early Přemyslid dynasty stronghold built in the late 9th and 10th century and surrounded by stone ramparts. Its fame came from a major historical event: the murder of Duke Wenceslaus by his brother Boleslaus at the gate of St Cosmas and Damian Church on 28 September 935 (or 929). After his death, Wenceslaus was proclaimed a saint by the church and became the patron saint of the Czech nation as well as a symbol of moral reinforcement during hard times.

After 1039, Bretislaus I established a new Romanesque basilica dedicated to St. Wenceslaus (consecrated in 1046 by the Prague bishop) at the site of the murder and pilgrimage site. Moreover, Bretislaus I had the Collegiate Chapter of St Cosmas and Damian, the oldest in Bohemia, built next to the basilica in 1052. By the end of the 11th century, the adjoining Romanesque Chapel of Saint Clement was built. It is valuable for its Romanesque frescos from the latter half of the 12th century depicting scenes from St. Clement's life and martyrdom.

In 1310 Bohemia fell under the House of Luxemburg and subsequently the Habsburgs. Emperor Charles IV often used to visit the town to hunt in the 14th century, supported the Chapter, and had new ramparts built.

The Hussite Wars starting in 1420 represented the beginning of the town's decline. Most of the buildings, including the Chapter house and the churches, were burned down, and the Chapter fled to Zittau.

In the late 16th and early 17th centuries, Boleslav regained its earlier fame through the cult of Madonna. In 1617–1625 the new Baroque Church of the Assumption of the Virgin Mary was built by Jacoppo de Vaccani, containing a relief of the Madonna called the Palladium of the Czech lands.

In 1960, the two adjacent towns were joined to form one town of Brandýs nad Labem-Stará Boleslav, after both towns refused to give up their names and accept a new one.

Religion
In 2003, the St. Wenceslaus National Pilgrimage to Stará Boleslav was renewed and is now the largest official celebration of St. Wenceslaus Day (28 September, Czech Statehood Day). On this occasion Pope Benedict XVI visited the St. Wenceslaus Basilica and held mass for over 50,000 people who had gathered in Stará Boleslav.

According to an article in Le Monde, the town is one of the least religious in all of the Czech Republic, and indeed of all of Europe and the world. Communists tried to repress the Catholic religion from the 1950s to the 1980s, something which continues to have profound effects on contemporary life in the town.

Demographics

Trivia
The name of municipality is the second longest in the country (after Nová Ves u Nového Města na Moravě) with 32 letters and spaces.

Notable people

Jan Tesánek (1728–1788), scholar and author of scientific literature
Karel Šebor (1843–1903), opera composer
Maria Theresa of Austria (1862–1933), archduchess
Leopold Salvator of Austria (1863–1931), archduke and Prince of Tuscany
Bohumil Honzátko (1875–1950), gymnast and long-distance runner
Antonín Bečvář (1901–1965), astronomer
Rudolf Kirs (1915–1963), cellist
David Novotný (born 1969), actor
David Rikl (born 1971), tennis player
Oto Biederman (born 1973), serial killer
Tomáš Votava (born 1974), footballer
Marek Matějovský (born 1981), footballer
Ondřej Synek (born 1982), rower, Olympic medalist
Michaela Uhrová (born 1982), basketball player
Amálie Hilgertová (born 1997), slalom canoeist

Twin towns – sister cities

Brandýs nad Labem-Stará Boleslav is twinned with:
 Dunaivtsi, Ukraine
 Gödöllő, Hungary
 Montescudaio, Italy

Gallery

References

External links

Place of pilgrimage

Cities and towns in the Czech Republic
Populated places in Prague-East District
Populated riverside places in the Czech Republic
Populated places on the Elbe